West Marshall Community School District is a rural public school district in central Iowa, United States. West Marshall spans the western side of Marshall County, with a small area in Story County, and includes the small towns of State Center, Melbourne, St. Anthony, Clemons, Rhodes, and LaMoille.

Schools
All of the district facilities are in State Center:
West Marshall Elementary School
West Marshall Middle School
West Marshall High School

West Marshall High School

Athletics
The Trojans compete in the Heart of Iowa Conference in the following sports:

Cross Country 
Volleyball
Football
Basketball 
Wrestling
Track and Field 
Golf 
Tennis 
Baseball 
Softball

State Championships
Football - 1999 State Champions, Class 1A 
Boys' Track and Field - 2012 State Champions, Class 2A

See also
List of school districts in Iowa
List of high schools in Iowa

References

External links
West Marshall Community School District official site

Schools in Marshall County, Iowa
School districts in Iowa